Bradford Abbas is a village and civil parish in north west Dorset, England,  southeast of Yeovil and  southwest of Sherborne. The parish includes the small settlement of Saxon Maybank to the north. In the 2011 census the population of the parish was 975.

The name of the village signifies the "Abbot's broad ford" on the River Ivel, the abbot in question being that of Sherborne; the land  was given to Sherborne Abbey by King Alfred the Great.

In the dry summer of 2010 cropmarks in sun-parched fields of barley, visible from the air, revealed the existence of a previously unsuspected 1st-century temporary Roman camp, one of only four detected in southwest Britain. In the 19th century five Roman kilns were found in a field to the east of the village. Also found at the site were pottery, roof slates, bracelets and querns.

Parish Church of St Mary 
The oldest part of the church is the chancel, dating from the 12th century, though the main construction of the church is 15th century and was started by William Bradford, Abbot of Sherborne. 

The tower has many niches on its west face, two containing finely carved original figures. The stone rood screen dates from the 15th century, and some of the steps leading to the rood loft are still extant.

Vicars 
This is a list of the vicars of St Mary's Church, Bradford Abbas. Since 1984, the title has been Rector of the United Benefice.

References

External links 

 {Bradford Abbas - The History of a Dorset Village} by Eric Garrett, Oxford Illustrated Press Ltd (1989)
 Dorset OPC: Bradford Abbas historical and genealogical resources
 Bradford Abbas FC Official Website
 Parish Council Website

Villages in Dorset